Club Arsenal de El Ferrol, also known as Ferrol Atlético, was a Spanish football team based in Ferrol, in the autonomous community of Galicia. Founded in 1936 as Club Galicia de El Ferrol, the team disappeared in 1993.

History
The origins of the team can be found in 1936, when Club Galicia de El Ferrol was born. In 1947, it was renamed Arsenal Club de Fútbol de El Ferrol and after, in 1956, Club Arsenal de El Ferrol.

In 1981 it became the reserve team of Racing de Ferrol, being thus renamed Ferrol Atlético. At the end of the 1992–93 season, the team was disbanded.

Club names
Club Galicia de El Ferrol – (1936–1947)
Arsenal Club de Fútbol de El Ferrol – (1947-1956)
Club Arsenal de El Ferrol – (1956-1981)
Ferrol Atlético – (1981-1993)

Season to season
 As Club Galicia de El Ferrol

 As Arsenal Club de Fútbol de El Ferrol

 As Club Arsenal de El Ferrol

 As Ferrol Atlético (Racing de Ferrol's reserve team)

23 seasons in Tercera División

External links
BDFutbol profile

Association football clubs established in 1936
Association football clubs disestablished in 1993
Defunct football clubs in Galicia
Football clubs in Galicia (Spain)
Ferrol, Spain
1936 establishments in Spain
1993 disestablishments in Spain